2016 LFF I Lyga is a Lithuanian second-tier football league season which started on 25 March 2016 and will finish in 6 November 2016. It consists of 16 teams.

Teams

Stadiums, personnel and sponsorship

League table

Attendance

References

2016
Lith
Lith
2